Sima Ganwani Ved is the Founder and Chairwoman of the Apparel group, a international retailer based in the Middle East headquartered in the UAE. She was named as the 12th most powerful businesswomen in the Middle East by Forbes.The company has over 80 brands and 2025 stores in 14 countries with over 18,500 employees. She is also the Vice Chair of the AppCorp, the holding company that has Apparel group, 6thStreet.com, Indus real estate, and Harley Medical Centre.

Early life
Sima was born in Africa and brought to Dubai by her father in the 1970s. She studied in King’s College, London for her Bachelor's degree and subsequently an MBA in business management. She started her career when she was 20, assisting in her father’s shopping mall in the 90s as the overseer of a department.

Awards
Philanthropreneur of the year.
Retailer of the year.
Great Women’s award.  
Emirates Woman of the year.

References

Living people
Indian businesspeople
Indian business executives
Indian emigrants to the United Arab Emirates
Indian expatriates in the United Arab Emirates
Year of birth missing (living people)